Boy Friend is a 1939 American comedy film second feature directed by James Tinling and written by Joseph Hoffman and Barry Trivers. The film stars Jane Withers, Arleen Whelan and George Ernest. The film was released on May 19, 1939, by 20th Century Fox.

Cast       
Jane Withers as Sally Murphy
Arleen Whelan as Sue Duffy 
George Ernest as Billy Bradley
Richard Bond as Jimmy Murphy
Douglas Fowley as Ed Boyd
Warren Hymer as Greenberg
Robert Kellard as Tommy Bradley
Minor Watson as Capt. Duffy
Robert Shaw as Cracker
Ted Pearson as Callahan
William H. Conselman Jr. as Arizona 
Myra Marsh as Mrs. Murphy
Harold Goodwin as Matchie Riggs
Lillian Yarbo as Delphinie (uncredited)

References

External links 
 

1939 films
20th Century Fox films
American comedy films
1939 comedy films
Films directed by James Tinling
American black-and-white films
Films scored by Samuel Kaylin
1930s English-language films
1930s American films